Rubiaceae is a family of flowering plants (anthophytes) in the order Gentianales, commonly known as the coffee, madder, or bedstraw family. It consists of terrestrial trees, shrubs, lianas, or herbs that are recognizable by simple, opposite leaves with interpetiolar stipules and sympetalous actinomorphic flowers. The family contains about 13,500 species in about 620 genera, which makes it the fourth-largest angiosperm family. Rubiaceae has a cosmopolitan distribution; however, the largest species diversity is concentrated in the tropics and subtropics.

23,420 species of vascular plant have been recorded in South Africa, making it the sixth most species-rich country in the world and the most species-rich country on the African continent. Of these, 153 species are considered to be threatened. Nine biomes have been described in South Africa: Fynbos, Succulent Karoo, desert, Nama Karoo, grassland, savanna, Albany thickets, the Indian Ocean coastal belt, and forests.

The 2018 South African National Biodiversity Institute's National Biodiversity Assessment plant checklist lists 35,130 taxa in the phyla Anthocerotophyta (hornworts (6)), Anthophyta (flowering plants (33534)), Bryophyta (mosses (685)), Cycadophyta (cycads (42)), Lycopodiophyta (Lycophytes(45)), Marchantiophyta (liverworts (376)), Pinophyta (conifers (33)), and Pteridophyta (cryptogams (408)).

65 genera are represented in the literature. Listed taxa include species, subspecies, varieties, and forms as recorded, some of which have subsequently been allocated to other taxa as synonyms, in which cases the accepted taxon is appended to the listing. Multiple entries under alternative names reflect taxonomic revision over time.

Afrocanthium 
Genus Afrocanthium:
 Afrocanthium gilfillanii (N.E.Br.) Lantz, indigenous
 Afrocanthium mundianum (Cham. & Schltdl.) Lantz, indigenous

Agathisanthemum 
Genus Agathisanthemum:
 Agathisanthemum bojeri Klotzsch, indigenous
 Agathisanthemum bojeri Klotzsch subsp. bojeri, indigenous
 Agathisanthemum chlorophyllum (Hochst.) Bremek. indigenous
 Agathisanthemum chlorophyllum (Hochst.) Bremek. var. chlorophyllum, endemic
 Agathisanthemum chlorophyllum (Hochst.) Bremek. var. pubescens Bremek. endemic

Alberta 
Genus Alberta:
 Alberta magna E.Mey. endemic

Ancylanthos 
Genus Ancylanthos:
 Ancylanthos bainesii Hiern, accepted as Ancylanthos rubiginosus Desf. 
 Ancylanthos monteiroi Oliv. accepted as Vangueria monteiroi (Oliv.) Lantz, indigenous

Anthospermum 
Genus Anthospermum:
 Anthospermum aethiopicum L. indigenous
 Anthospermum basuticum Puff, indigenous
 Anthospermum bergianum Cruse, endemic
 Anthospermum bicorne Puff, endemic
 Anthospermum comptonii Puff, endemic
 Anthospermum crocyllis Sond. accepted as Plocama crocyllis (Sond.) M.Backlund & Thulin, present
 Anthospermum dregei Sond. indigenous
 Anthospermum dregei Sond. subsp. dregei, indigenous
 Anthospermum dregei Sond. subsp. ecklonis (Sond.) Puff, endemic
 Anthospermum ericifolium (Licht. ex Roem. & Schult.) Kuntze, endemic
 Anthospermum esterhuysenianum Puff, indigenous
 Anthospermum esterhuysenianum Puff var. esterhuysenianum,   endemic
 Anthospermum esterhuysenianum Puff var. hirsutum Puff, endemic
 Anthospermum galioides Rchb.f. indigenous
 Anthospermum galioides Rchb.f. subsp. galioides, endemic
 Anthospermum galioides Rchb.f. subsp. reflexifolium (Kuntze) Puff, endemic
 Anthospermum galpinii Schltr. endemic
 Anthospermum herbaceum L.f. indigenous
 Anthospermum hirtum Cruse, endemic
 Anthospermum hispidulum E.Mey. ex Sond. indigenous
 Anthospermum littoreum L.Bolus, endemic
 Anthospermum monticola Puff, indigenous
 Anthospermum paniculatum Cruse, endemic
 Anthospermum prostratum Sond. endemic
 Anthospermum rigidum Eckl. & Zeyh. indigenous
 Anthospermum rigidum Eckl. & Zeyh. subsp. pumilum (Sond.) Puff, indigenous
 Anthospermum rigidum Eckl. & Zeyh. subsp. rigidum, indigenous
 Anthospermum spathulatum Spreng. indigenous
 Anthospermum spathulatum Spreng. subsp. ecklonianum (Cruse) Puff, endemic
 Anthospermum spathulatum Spreng. subsp. saxatile Puff, endemic
 Anthospermum spathulatum Spreng. subsp. spathulatum,   indigenous
 Anthospermum spathulatum Spreng. subsp. tulbaghense Puff, endemic
 Anthospermum spathulatum Spreng. subsp. uitenhagense Puff, endemic
 Anthospermum streyi Puff, endemic
 Anthospermum welwitschii Hiern, indigenous

Breonadia 
Genus Breonadia:
 Breonadia salicina (Vahl) Hepper & J.R.I.Wood, indigenous

Burchellia 
Genus Burchellia:
 Burchellia bubalina (L.f.) Sims, indigenous

Canthium 
Genus Canthium:
 Canthium armatum (K.Schum.) Lantz, indigenous
 Canthium ciliatum (Klotzsch) Kuntze, indigenous
 Canthium gilfillanii (N.E.Br.) O.B.Mill. accepted as Afrocanthium gilfillanii (N.E.Br.) Lantz, indigenous
 Canthium inerme (L.f.) Kuntze, indigenous
 Canthium kuntzeanum Bridson, indigenous
 Canthium mundianum Cham. & Schltdl. accepted as Afrocanthium mundianum (Cham. & Schltdl.) Lantz, indigenous
 Canthium pseudorandii Bridson, accepted as Afrocanthium pseudorandii (Bridson) Lantz 
 Canthium setiflorum Hiern, accepted as Bullockia setiflora (Hiern) Razafim. Lantz & B.Bremer, present
 Canthium spinosum (Klotzsch) Kuntze, indigenous
 Canthium suberosum Codd, indigenous
 Canthium vanwykii Tilney & Kok, endemic

Carpacoce 
Genus Carpacoce:
 Carpacoce burchellii Puff, endemic
 Carpacoce curvifolia Puff, endemic
 Carpacoce gigantea Puff, endemic
 Carpacoce heteromorpha (H.Buek) L.Bolus, endemic
 Carpacoce scabra (Thunb.) Sond. indigenous
 Carpacoce scabra (Thunb.) Sond. subsp. rupestris Puff, endemic
 Carpacoce scabra (Thunb.) Sond. subsp. scabra, endemic
 Carpacoce spermacocea (Rchb.f.) Sond. indigenous
 Carpacoce spermacocea (Rchb.f.) Sond. subsp. orientalis Puff, endemic
 Carpacoce spermacocea (Rchb.f.) Sond. subsp. spermacocea, endemic
 Carpacoce vaginellata T.M.Salter, endemic

Catunaregam 
Genus Catunaregam:
 Catunaregam obovata (Hochst.) A.E.GonÃ§. indigenous
 Catunaregam taylorii (S.Moore) Bridson, indigenous

Cephalanthus 
Genus Cephalanthus:
 Cephalanthus natalensis Oliv. indigenous

Coddia 
Genus Coddia:
 Coddia rudis (E.Mey. ex Harv.) Verdc. indigenous

Coffea 
Genus Coffea:
 Coffea racemosa Lour. indigenous
 Coffea zanguebariae Lour. indigenous

Conostomium 
Genus Conostomium:
 Conostomium natalense (Hochst.) Bremek. indigenous
 Conostomium natalense (Hochst.) Bremek. var. glabrum Bremek. indigenous
 Conostomium natalense (Hochst.) Bremek. var. natalense,   indigenous
 Conostomium natalense (Hochst.) Bremek. var. ovalifolium Bremek. indigenous
 Conostomium zoutpansbergense (Bremek.) Bremek. endemic

Coprosma 
Genus Coprosma:
 Coprosma repens A.Rich. not indigenous, cultivated, naturalised, invasive

Coptosperma 
Genus Coptosperma:
 Coptosperma littorale (Hiern) Degreef, indigenous
 Coptosperma rhodesiacum (Bremek.) Degreef, indigenous
 Coptosperma supra-axillare (Hemsl.) Degreef, indigenous
 Coptosperma zygoon (Bridson) Degreef, indigenous

Cordylostigma 
Genus Cordylostigma:
 Cordylostigma longifolia (Klotzsch) Groeninckx & Dessein, indigenous
 Cordylostigma virgata (Willd.) Groeninckx & Dessein, indigenous

Crocyllis 
Genus Crocyllis:
 Crocyllis anthospermoides E.Mey. ex K.Schum. accepted as Plocama crocyllis (Sond.) M.Backlund & Thulin, present

Crossopteryx 
Genus Crossopteryx:
 Crossopteryx febrifuga (Afzel. ex G.Don) Benth. indigenous

Diodia 
Genus Diodia:
 Diodia dasycephala Cham. & Schltdl. not indigenous, naturalised

Diplospora 
Genus Diplospora:
 Diplospora africana Sim, accepted as Empogona africana (Sim) Tosh & Robbr. indigenous

Empogona 
Genus Empogona:
 Empogona africana (Sim) Tosh & Robbr. endemic
 Empogona cacondensis (Hiern) Tosh & Robbr. indigenous
 Empogona coriacea (Sond.) Tosh & Robbr. indigenous
 Empogona junodii Schinz, accepted as Empogona kirkii Hook.f. subsp. junodii (Schinz) Tosh & Robbr. indigenous
 Empogona kirkii Hook.f. indigenous
 Empogona kirkii Hook.f. subsp. junodii (Schinz) Tosh & Robbr. indigenous
 Empogona kirkii Hook.f. subsp. kirkii, indigenous
 Empogona lanceolata (Sond.) Tosh & Robbr. indigenous
 Empogona maputensis (Bridson & A.E.van Wyk) Tosh & Robbr. indigenous

Eriosemopsis 
Genus Eriosemopsis:
 Eriosemopsis subanisophylla Robyns, endemic

Fadogia 
Genus Fadogia:
 Fadogia homblei De Wild. indigenous
 Fadogia tetraquetra K.Krause, indigenous
 Fadogia tetraquetra K.Krause var. grandiflora (Robyns) Verdc. indigenous
 Fadogia tetraquetra K.Krause var. tetraquetra, indigenous

Gaillonia 
Genus Gaillonia:
 Gaillonia crocyllis (Sond.) Thulin, accepted as Plocama crocyllis (Sond.) M.Backlund & Thulin, indigenous

Galium 
Genus Galium:
 Galium amatymbicum Eckl. & Zeyh. endemic
 Galium bredasdorpense Puff, endemic
 Galium capense Thunb. indigenous
 Galium capense Thunb. subsp. capense, indigenous
 Galium capense Thunb. subsp. garipense (Sond.) Puff var. garipense, indigenous
 Galium capense Thunb. subsp. namaquense (Eckl. & Zeyh.) Puff, endemic
 Galium monticolum Sond. endemic
 Galium mucroniferum Sond. indigenous
 Galium mucroniferum Sond. var. dregeanum (Sond.) Puff, indigenous
 Galium mucroniferum Sond. var. mucroniferum, endemic
 Galium rourkei Puff, endemic
 Galium scabrelloides Puff, indigenous
 Galium spurium L. indigenous
 Galium spurium L. subsp. africanum Verdc. indigenous
 Galium spurium-aparine complex, endemic
 Galium subvillosum Sond. indigenous
 Galium subvillosum Sond. var. subglabrum Puff, endemic
 Galium subvillosum Sond. var. subvillosum, indigenous
 Galium thunbergianum Eckl. & Zeyh. indigenous
 Galium thunbergianum Eckl. & Zeyh. var. hirsutum (Sond.) Verdc. indigenous
 Galium thunbergianum Eckl. & Zeyh. var. thunbergianum, indigenous
 Galium tomentosum Thunb. indigenous
 Galium undulatum Puff, endemic

Galopina 
Genus Galopina:
 Galopina aspera (Eckl. & Zeyh.) Walp. indigenous
 Galopina circaeoides Thunb. indigenous
 Galopina crocyllioides Bar ex Schinz, indigenous
 Galopina tomentosa Hochst. endemic

Gardenia 
Genus Gardenia:
 Gardenia citriodora Hook. accepted as Mitriostigma axillare Hochst. present
 Gardenia cornuta Hemsl. indigenous
 Gardenia lutea Fresen. accepted as Gardenia ternifolia Schumach. & Thonn. subsp. jovis-tonantis (Welw.) Verdc. var. jovis-tonantis, indigenous
 Gardenia resiniflua Hiern, indigenous
 Gardenia resiniflua Hiern subsp. resiniflua, indigenous
 Gardenia ternifolia Schumach. & Thonn. indigenous
 Gardenia ternifolia Schumach. & Thonn. subsp. jovis-tonantis (Welw.) Verdc. var. goetzei,   indigenous
 Gardenia thunbergia L.f. indigenous
 Gardenia volkensii K.Schum. indigenous
 Gardenia volkensii K.Schum. subsp. spatulifolia (Stapf & Hutch.) Verdc. indigenous
 Gardenia volkensii K.Schum. subsp. volkensii var. saundersiae, indigenous
 Gardenia volkensii K.Schum. subsp. volkensii var. volkensii, indigenous

Geophila 
Genus Geophila:
 Geophila repens (L.) I.M.Johnst. indigenous

Guettarda 
Genus Guettarda:
 Guettarda speciosa L. indigenous

Hedyotis 
Genus Hedyotis:
 Hedyotis gerrardii Harv. ex Sond. accepted as Cordylostigma virgata (Willd.) Groeninckx & Dessein, indigenous
 Hedyotis virgata Willd. accepted as Cordylostigma virgata (Willd.) Groeninckx & Dessein, indigenous

Heinsia 
Genus Heinsia:
 Heinsia crinita (Afzel.) G.Taylor, indigenous
 Heinsia crinita (Afzel.) G.Taylor subsp. parviflora (K.Schum. & K.Krause) Verdc. indigenous

Hymenodictyon 
Genus Hymenodictyon:
 Hymenodictyon parvifolium Oliv. indigenous
 Hymenodictyon parvifolium Oliv. subsp. parvifolium, indigenous

Hyperacanthus 
Genus Hyperacanthus:
 Hyperacanthus amoenus (Sims) Bridson, indigenous
 Hyperacanthus microphyllus (K.Schum.) Bridson, indigenous

Hypobathrum 
Genus Hypobathrum:
 Hypobathrum kirkii (Hook.f.) Baill. accepted as Empogona kirkii Hook.f. subsp. kirkii, indigenous
 Hypobathrum lanceolatum (Sond.) Baill. accepted as Empogona lanceolata (Sond.) Tosh & Robbr. indigenous

Ixora 
Genus Ixora:
 Ixora coccinea L. not indigenous, cultivated, naturalised, invasive

Keetia 
Genus Keetia:
 Keetia gueinzii (Sond.) Bridson, indigenous

Kohautia 
Genus Kohautia:
 Kohautia amatymbica Eckl. & Zeyh. indigenous
 Kohautia aspera (Roth) Bremek. indigenous
 Kohautia caespitosa Schnizl. indigenous
 Kohautia caespitosa Schnizl. subsp. brachyloba (Sond.) D.Mantell, indigenous
 Kohautia cynanchica DC. indigenous
 Kohautia latibrachiata Bremek. endemic
 Kohautia longifolia Klotzsch, accepted as Cordylostigma longifolia (Klotzsch) Groeninckx & Dessein, indigenous
 Kohautia microflora D.Mantell, indigenous
 Kohautia subverticillata (K.Schum.) D.Mantell, indigenous
 Kohautia subverticillata (K.Schum.) D.Mantell subsp. subverticillata, indigenous
 Kohautia virgata (Willd.) Bremek. accepted as Cordylostigma virgata (Willd.) Groeninckx & Dessein, indigenous

Kraussia 
Genus Kraussia:
 Kraussia coriacea Sond. accepted as Empogona coriacea (Sond.) Tosh & Robbr. indigenous
 Kraussia floribunda Harv. indigenous
 Kraussia lanceolata Sond. accepted as Empogona lanceolata (Sond.) Tosh & Robbr. indigenous
 Kraussia schlechteri (K.Schum.) Bullock, accepted as Kraussia floribunda Harv. present

Lagynias 
Genus Lagynias:
 Lagynias dryadum (S.Moore) Robyns, accepted as Vangueria dryadum S.Moore, indigenous
 Lagynias lasiantha (Sond.) Bullock, accepted as Vangueria lasiantha (Sond.) Sond. indigenous
 Lagynias monteiroi (Oliv.) Bridson, accepted as Vangueria monteiroi (Oliv.) Lantz, indigenous

Leptactina 
Genus Leptactina:
 Leptactina delagoensis K.Schum. indigenous
 Leptactina delagoensis K.Schum. subsp. delagoensis, indigenous

Mitriostigma 
Genus Mitriostigma:
 Mitriostigma axillare Hochst. endemic

Nenax 
Genus Nenax:
 Nenax acerosa Gaertn. indigenous
 Nenax acerosa Gaertn. subsp. acerosa, endemic
 Nenax acerosa Gaertn. subsp. macrocarpa (Eckl. & Zeyh.) Puff, endemic
 Nenax arenicola Puff, endemic
 Nenax cinerea (Thunb.) Puff, indigenous
 Nenax coronata Puff, endemic
 Nenax divaricata T.M.Salter, endemic
 Nenax elsieae Puff, endemic
 Nenax hirta (Cruse) T.M.Salter, indigenous
 Nenax hirta (Cruse) T.M.Salter subsp. calciphila Puff, endemic
 Nenax hirta (Cruse) T.M.Salter subsp. hirta, endemic
 Nenax microphylla (Sond.) T.M.Salter, indigenous
 Nenax namaquensis Puff, endemic
 Nenax velutina J.C.Manning & Goldblatt, indigenous

Oldenlandia 
Genus Oldenlandia:
 Oldenlandia affinis (Roem. & Schult.) DC. indigenous
 Oldenlandia affinis (Roem. & Schult.) DC. subsp. fugax (Vatke) Verdc. indigenous
 Oldenlandia capensis L.f. indigenous
 Oldenlandia capensis L.f. var. capensis, indigenous
 Oldenlandia cephalotes (Hochst.) Kuntze, indigenous
 Oldenlandia corymbosa L. indigenous
 Oldenlandia corymbosa L. var. caespitosa (Benth.) Verdc. indigenous
 Oldenlandia geminiflora (Sond.) Kuntze, endemic
 Oldenlandia herbacea (L.) Roxb. indigenous
 Oldenlandia herbacea (L.) Roxb. var. flaccida Bremek. indigenous
 Oldenlandia herbacea (L.) Roxb. var. herbacea, indigenous
 Oldenlandia herbacea (L.) Roxb. var. suffruticosa Bremek. endemic
 Oldenlandia lancifolia (Schumach.) DC. indigenous
 Oldenlandia lancifolia (Schumach.) DC. var. scabridula Bremek. indigenous
 Oldenlandia muscosa Bremek. indigenous
 Oldenlandia rosulata K.Schum. indigenous
 Oldenlandia rosulata K.Schum. var. rosulata, indigenous
 Oldenlandia rupicola (Sond.) Kuntze, indigenous
 Oldenlandia rupicola (Sond.) Kuntze var. hirtula (Sond.) Bremek. indigenous
 Oldenlandia rupicola (Sond.) Kuntze var. rupicola, indigenous
 Oldenlandia tenella (Hochst.) Kuntze, indigenous
 Oldenlandia virgata (Willd.) DC. accepted as Cordylostigma virgata (Willd.) Groeninckx & Dessein, indigenous

Otiophora 
Genus Otiophora:
 Otiophora calycophylla (Sond.) Schltr. & K.Schum. indigenous
 Otiophora calycophylla (Sond.) Schltr. & K.Schum. subsp. calycophylla, endemic
 Otiophora calycophylla (Sond.) Schltr. & K.Schum. subsp. verdcourtii Puff, endemic
 Otiophora cupheoides N.E.Br. indigenous

Oxyanthus 
Genus Oxyanthus:
 Oxyanthus latifolius Sond. indigenous
 Oxyanthus pyriformis (Hochst.) Skeels, indigenous
 Oxyanthus pyriformis (Hochst.) Skeels subsp. pyriformis, indigenous
 Oxyanthus speciosus DC. indigenous
 Oxyanthus speciosus DC. subsp. gerrardii (Sond.) Bridson, indigenous
 Oxyanthus speciosus DC. subsp. stenocarpus (K.Schum.) Bridson, indigenous

Pachystigma 
Genus Pachystigma:
 Pachystigma bowkeri Robyns, indigenous
 Pachystigma caffrum (Sim) Robyns, indigenous
 Pachystigma coeruleum Robyns, indigenous
 Pachystigma cymosum Robyns, indigenous
 Pachystigma latifolium Sond. indigenous
 Pachystigma macrocalyx (Sond.) Robyns, indigenous
 Pachystigma pygmaeum (Schltr.) Robyns, indigenous
 Pachystigma thamnus Robyns, endemic
 Pachystigma triflorum Robyns, endemic
 Pachystigma venosum Hochst. indigenous

Paederia 
Genus Paederia:
 Paederia bojeriana (A.Rich.) Drake, indigenous
 Paederia bojeriana (A.Rich.) Drake subsp. foetens (Hiern) Verdc. indigenous

Pavetta 
Genus Pavetta:
 Pavetta alexandrae Bremek. accepted as Pavetta lanceolata Eckl. present
 Pavetta assimilis Sond. var. assimilis, accepted as Pavetta gardeniifolia A.Rich. var. gardeniifolia, present
 Pavetta assimilis Sond. var. brevituba-glabra Bremek. accepted as Pavetta gardeniifolia A.Rich. var. gardeniifolia,   present
 Pavetta assimilis Sond. var. brevituba-pubescens Bremek. accepted as Pavetta gardeniifolia A.Rich. var. subtomentosa K.Schum. present
 Pavetta assimilis Sond. var. pubescens Bremek. accepted as Pavetta gardeniifolia A.Rich. var. subtomentosa K.Schum. present
 Pavetta barbertonensis Bremek. indigenous
 Pavetta bowkeri Harv. endemic
 Pavetta breyeri Bremek. accepted as Pavetta gracilifolia Bremek. present
 Pavetta breyeri Bremek. var. glabra Bremek. accepted as Pavetta gracilifolia Bremek. present
 Pavetta capensis (Houtt.) Bremek. indigenous
 Pavetta capensis (Houtt.) Bremek. subsp. capensis,   endemic
 Pavetta capensis (Houtt.) Bremek. subsp. komghensis (Bremek.) Kok, endemic
 Pavetta catophylla K.Schum. indigenous
 Pavetta cooperi Harv. & Sond. indigenous
 Pavetta disarticulata Galpin, accepted as Pavetta edentula Sond. present
 Pavetta edentula Sond. indigenous
 Pavetta eylesii S.Moore, indigenous
 Pavetta galpinii Bremek. indigenous
 Pavetta gardeniifolia A.Rich. indigenous
 Pavetta gardeniifolia A.Rich. var. gardeniifolia, indigenous
 Pavetta gardeniifolia A.Rich. var. subtomentosa K.Schum. indigenous
 Pavetta gerstneri Bremek. indigenous
 Pavetta glaucophylla S.J.Siebert, Retief & A.E.van Wyk, endemic
 Pavetta gracilifolia Bremek. indigenous
 Pavetta gracilifolia Bremek. var. glabra Bremek. accepted as Pavetta gracilifolia Bremek. present
 Pavetta harborii S.Moore, indigenous
 Pavetta heidelbergensis Bremek. accepted as Pavetta gardeniifolia A.Rich. var. subtomentosa K.Schum. present
 Pavetta inandensis Bremek. indigenous
 Pavetta inconspicua Dinter ex Bremek. accepted as Pavetta zeyheri Sond. subsp. zeyheri 
 Pavetta kotzei Bremek. endemic
 Pavetta krauseana K.Krause, accepted as Pavetta gardeniifolia A.Rich. var. gardeniifolia 
 Pavetta lanceolata Eckl. indigenous
 Pavetta natalensis Sond. endemic
 Pavetta opaca Bremek. accepted as Pavetta lanceolata Eckl. present
 Pavetta revoluta Hochst. indigenous
 Pavetta schumanniana F.Hoffm. ex K.Schum. indigenous
 Pavetta trichardtensis Bremek. endemic
 Pavetta tristis Bremek. accepted as Pavetta lanceolata Eckl. present
 Pavetta tshikondeni N.Hahn, endemic
 Pavetta vanwykiana Bridson, indigenous
 Pavetta woodii Bremek. accepted as Pavetta gracilifolia Bremek. present
 Pavetta zeyheri Sond. indigenous
 Pavetta zeyheri Sond. subsp. microlancea (K.Schum.) P.P.J.Herman, endemic
 Pavetta zeyheri Sond. subsp. middelburgensis (Bremek.) P.P.J.Herman, endemic
 Pavetta zeyheri Sond. subsp. zeyheri, indigenous

Pentanisia 
Genus Pentanisia:
 Pentanisia angustifolia (Hochst.) Hochst. indigenous
 Pentanisia prunelloides (Klotzsch ex Eckl. & Zeyh.) Walp. indigenous
 Pentanisia prunelloides (Klotzsch ex Eckl. & Zeyh.) Walp. subsp. latifolia (Hochst.) Verdc. indigenous
 Pentanisia prunelloides (Klotzsch ex Eckl. & Zeyh.) Walp. subsp. prunelloides,   indigenous
 Pentanisia sykesii Hutch. indigenous
 Pentanisia sykesii Hutch. subsp. otomerioides Verdc. indigenous

Pentas 
Genus Pentas:
 Pentas angustifolia (A.Rich. ex DC.) Verdc. indigenous
 Pentas micrantha Baker, indigenous
 Pentas micrantha Baker subsp. wyliei (N.E.Br.) Verdc. indigenous

Pentodon 
Genus Pentodon:
 Pentodon pentandrus (Schumach. & Thonn.) Vatke, indigenous
 Pentodon pentandrus (Schumach. & Thonn.) Vatke var. minor Bremek. indigenous
 Pentodon pentandrus (Schumach. & Thonn.) Vatke var. pentandrus, indigenous

Phylohydrax 
Genus Phylohydrax:
 Phylohydrax carnosa (Hochst.) Puff, indigenous

Plectronia 
Genus Plectronia:
 Plectronia foliosa Burtt Davy, accepted as Pavetta eylesii S.Moore, present
 Plectronia ventosa L. accepted as Olinia ventosa (L.) Cufod. indigenous

Plectroniella 
Genus Plectroniella:
 Plectroniella armata (K.Schum.) Robyns, accepted as Canthium armatum (K.Schum.) Lantz, indigenous
 Plectroniella capillaris Bremek. indigenous

Plocama 
Genus Plocama:
 Plocama crocyllis (Sond.) M.Backlund & Thulin, indigenous

Psychotria 
Genus Psychotria:
 Psychotria capensis (Eckl.) Vatke, indigenous
 Psychotria capensis (Eckl.) Vatke subsp. capensis,   indigenous
 Psychotria capensis (Eckl.) Vatke subsp. capensis var. capensis,   indigenous
 Psychotria capensis (Eckl.) Vatke subsp. capensis var. pubescens,   endemic
 Psychotria zombamontana (Kuntze) E.M.A.Petit, indigenous

Psydrax 
Genus Psydrax:
 Psydrax capensis J.C.Manning & Goldblatt, endemic
 Psydrax fragrantissima (K.Schum.) Bridson, indigenous
 Psydrax livida (Hiern) Bridson, indigenous
 Psydrax locuples (K.Schum.) Bridson, indigenous
 Psydrax obovata (Eckl. & Zeyh.) Bridson, indigenous
 Psydrax obovata (Eckl. & Zeyh.) Bridson subsp. elliptica Bridson, indigenous
 Psydrax obovata (Eckl. & Zeyh.) Bridson subsp. obovata,   indigenous

Pygmaeothamnus 
Genus Pygmaeothamnus:
 Pygmaeothamnus chamaedendrum (Kuntze) Robyns, indigenous
 Pygmaeothamnus chamaedendrum (Kuntze) Robyns var. chamaedendrum,   endemic
 Pygmaeothamnus chamaedendrum (Kuntze) Robyns var. setulosus Robyns, indigenous
 Pygmaeothamnus zeyheri (Sond.) Robyns, indigenous
 Pygmaeothamnus zeyheri (Sond.) Robyns var. rogersii Robyns, endemic
 Pygmaeothamnus zeyheri (Sond.) Robyns var. zeyheri,   indigenous

Pyrostria 
Genus Pyrostria:
 Pyrostria hystrix (Bremek.) Bridson, indigenous

Randia 
Genus Randia:
 Randia bellatula K.Schum. accepted as Rothmannia capensis Thunb. present
 Randia kraussii Harv. accepted as Catunaregam obovata (Hochst.) A.E.GonÃ§. present
 Randia parvifolia Harv. accepted as Coddia rudis (E.Mey. ex Harv.) Verdc. present

Richardia 
Genus Richardia:
 Richardia brasiliensis Gomes, not indigenous, naturalised
 Richardia humistrata (Cham. & Schltdl.) Steud. not indigenous, naturalised
 Richardia scabra L. not indigenous, naturalised
 Richardia stellaris (Cham. & Schltdl.) Steud. not indigenous, naturalised

Rothmannia 
Genus Rothmannia:
 Rothmannia capensis Thunb. indigenous
 Rothmannia fischeri (K.Schum.) Bullock, indigenous
 Rothmannia fischeri (K.Schum.) Bullock subsp. fischeri,   indigenous
 Rothmannia fischeri (K.Schum.) Bullock subsp. moramballae (Hiern) Bridson, indigenous
 Rothmannia globosa (Hochst.) Keay, indigenous

Rubia 
Genus Rubia:
 Rubia cordifolia L. subsp. conotricha (Gand.) Verdc. indigenous
 Rubia horrida (Thunb.) Puff, indigenous
 Rubia petiolaris DC. indigenous

Rytigynia 
Genus Rytigynia:
 Rytigynia celastroides (Baill.) Verdc. indigenous
 Rytigynia celastroides (Baill.) Verdc. var. australis Verdc. indigenous

Sericanthe 
Genus Sericanthe:
 Sericanthe andongensis (Hiern) Robbr. indigenous
 Sericanthe andongensis (Hiern) Robbr. subsp. andongensis, indigenous
 Sericanthe andongensis (Hiern) Robbr. subsp. andongensis var. andongensis, indigenous
 Sericanthe andongensis (Hiern) Robbr. subsp. legatii (Hutch.) Jordaan & H.M.Steyn, indigenous

Sherardia 
Genus Sherardia:
 Sherardia arvensis L. not indigenous, naturalised

Spermacoce 
Genus Spermacoce:
 Spermacoce deserti N.E.Br. endemic
 Spermacoce natalensis Hochst. indigenous
 Spermacoce senensis (Klotzsch) Hiern, indigenous

Stylocoryne 
Genus Stylocoryne:
 Stylocoryne barbertonensis Bremek. accepted as Coptosperma supra-axillare (Hemsl.) Degreef, present

Tapiphyllum 
Genus Tapiphyllum:
 Tapiphyllum parvifolium (Sond.) Robyns, accepted as Vangueria parvifolia Sond. present

Tarenna 
Genus Tarenna:
 Tarenna junodii (Schinz) Bremek. indigenous
 Tarenna littoralis (Hiern) Bridson, accepted as Coptosperma littorale (Hiern) Degreef, present
 Tarenna nigrescens (Hook.f.) Hiern, accepted as Coptosperma nigrescens Hook.f. 
 Tarenna pavettoides (Harv.) Sim, indigenous
 Tarenna pavettoides (Harv.) Sim subsp. pavettoides,   indigenous
 Tarenna supra-axillaris (Hemsl.) Bremek. subsp. barbertonensis (Bremek.) Bridson, accepted as Coptosperma supra-axillare (Hemsl.) Degreef, present
 Tarenna zimbabwensis Bridson, accepted as Coptosperma rhodesiacum (Bremek.) Degreef, present
 Tarenna zygoon Bridson, accepted as Coptosperma zygoon (Bridson) Degreef, present

Tricalysia 
Genus Tricalysia:
 Tricalysia africana (Sim) Robbr. accepted as Empogona africana (Sim) Tosh & Robbr. endemic
 Tricalysia allenii (Stapf) Brenan, accepted as Empogona kirkii Hook.f. subsp. kirkii,   indigenous
 Tricalysia allenii (Stapf) Brenan var. australis (Schweick.) Brenan, accepted as Empogona kirkii Hook.f. subsp. junodii (Schinz) Tosh & Robbr. indigenous
 Tricalysia allenii (Stapf) Brenan var. kirkii (Hook.f.) Brenan, accepted as Empogona kirkii Hook.f. subsp. kirkii,   indigenous
 Tricalysia cacondensis Hiern, accepted as Empogona cacondensis (Hiern) Tosh & Robbr. indigenous
 Tricalysia capensis (Meisn. ex Hochst.) Sim, indigenous
 Tricalysia capensis (Meisn. ex Hochst.) Sim var. capensis,   indigenous
 Tricalysia capensis (Meisn. ex Hochst.) Sim var. galpinii (Schinz) Robbr. indigenous
 Tricalysia capensis (Meisn. ex Hochst.) Sim var. transvaalensis Robbr. indigenous
 Tricalysia coriacea (Benth.) Hiern, indigenous
 Tricalysia delagoensis Schinz, indigenous
 Tricalysia galpinii Schinz, accepted as Tricalysia capensis (Meisn. ex Hochst.) Sim var. galpinii (Schinz) Robbr. indigenous
 Tricalysia junodii (Schinz) Brenan, accepted as Empogona kirkii Hook.f. subsp. junodii (Schinz) Tosh & Robbr. indigenous
 Tricalysia junodii (Schinz) Brenan var. kirkii (Hook.f.) Robbr. accepted as Empogona kirkii Hook.f. subsp. kirkii,   indigenous
 Tricalysia lanceolata (Sond.) Burtt Davy, accepted as Empogona lanceolata (Sond.) Tosh & Robbr. indigenous
 Tricalysia maputensis Bridson & A.E.van Wyk, accepted as Empogona maputensis (Bridson & A.E.van Wyk) Tosh & Robbr. indigenous
 Tricalysia sonderiana Hiern, accepted as Empogona coriacea (Sond.) Tosh & Robbr. indigenous

Trichostachys 
Genus Trichostachys:
 Trichostachys speciosa Welw. accepted as Faurea rochetiana (A.Rich.) Chiov. ex Pic.Serm. indigenous

Vangueria 
Genus Vangueria:
 Vangueria bowkeri (Robyns) Lantz, indigenous
 Vangueria coerulea (Robyns) Lantz, indigenous
 Vangueria dryadum S.Moore, indigenous
 Vangueria esculenta S.Moore, indigenous
 Vangueria infausta Burch. indigenous
 Vangueria infausta Burch. subsp. infausta,   indigenous
 Vangueria lasiantha (Sond.) Sond. indigenous
 Vangueria lasioclados K.Schum. accepted as Vangueria proschii Briq. 
 Vangueria madagascariensis J.F.Gmel. indigenous
 Vangueria monteiroi (Oliv.) Lantz, indigenous
 Vangueria randii S.Moore, indigenous
 Vangueria randii S.Moore subsp. chartacea (Robyns) Verdc. indigenous
 Vangueria soutpansbergensis N.Hahn, endemic
 Vangueria thamnus (Robyns) Lantz, endemic
 Vangueria triflora (Robyns) Lantz, endemic

References

South African plant biodiversity lists
Rubiaceae